Ajuwa (Ajegha) is a Plateau language of Kaduna State, Nigeria. It is spoken in Kalla, Afogo, Iburu, Idon, and Makyali towns. Ajuwa was reported by Roger Blench (2019), but is not reported in Ethnologue or Glottolog. Blench classifies it as Northwestern.

References

External links
Ejegha wordlist

Central Plateau languages
Languages of Nigeria